Japanoasternolaelaps is a genus of mites in the family Ichthyostomatogasteridae.

Species
 Japanoasternolaelaps japanensis W. Hirschmann & N. Hiramatsu, 1984

References

Laelapidae